Charles Magill (March 1, 1816 – December 1, 1898) was a member of the 1st Canadian Parliament and mayor of Hamilton in 1854–55, 1865–66 and 1882–3.

He was born in Westport, County Mayo, Ireland, the son of Robert Magill and Catherine Benner, in 1816 and came to Upper Canada with his family in 1832. After moving to Hamilton in 1833, he worked for a time in a store owned by Isaac Buchanan, who represented the city in the Legislative Assembly. He established himself as a merchant in 1840. In 1848, Magill married Ann Eliza Wright. He was elected to the city council in 1852 and later served several terms as mayor. Magill also served as chairman of the Board of Health, a Justice of the Peace for Wentworth County and chairman of the Board of Water Commissioners. He was elected to the last parliament of the Province of Canada in a by-election in 1866 and was re-elected in 1867 as a Liberal member for the riding of Hamilton. Magill was defeated when he ran for reelection to the House of Commons in 1872. He served as lieutenant-colonel in the militia. Magill was also a prominent member of the local Masonic lodge.

He died in Hamilton in 1898.

References
 
The Canadian parliamentary companion, HJ Morgan (1871)

Liberal Party of Canada MPs
Members of the House of Commons of Canada from Ontario
Members of the Legislative Assembly of the Province of Canada from Canada West
Mayors of Hamilton, Ontario
Irish emigrants to pre-Confederation Ontario
Politicians from County Mayo
1816 births
1898 deaths
Immigrants to Upper Canada
Canadian justices of the peace